Klamek ji bo Beko (A Song for Beko) is a 1992 film written and directed by Nizamettin Arıç. It is one of the first Kurdish films.

Plot
The odyssey of a Kurdish man (Beko) in search of his brother, who has fled to avoid being drafted into the Turkish Armed Forces. Escaping arrest in Turkey, he flees to Syria and from there to Iraqi Kurdistan, where he finally finds refuge among displaced children. In Iraq, Beko manages to survive the Iraqi chemical attacks in 1988, and along with a blind girl, he makes it to Germany. Eventually he discovers that his brother was drafted in the Army and killed in the conflict with Kurdish guerillas.

Awards
 Special Jury and Audience Awards, Fribourg International Film Festival, 1994.
 Audience Award, São Paulo International Film Festival, 1993.
 Audience Award, Angers European First Film Festival, 1993.

References

External links 
 

1992 films
1992 drama films
Kurdish films
Kurdish-language films
Kurdish words and phrases